Art therapy (not to be confused with arts therapy, which includes other creative therapies such as drama therapy and music therapy) is a distinct discipline that incorporates creative methods of expression through visual art media.  Art therapy, as a creative arts therapy profession, originated in the fields of art and psychotherapy and may vary in definition.

There are three main ways that art therapy is employed. The first one is called analytic art therapy. Analytic art therapy is based on the theories that come from analytical psychology, and in more cases, psychoanalysis. Analytic art therapy focuses on the client, the therapist, and the ideas that are transferred between the both of them through art. Another way that art therapy is utilized is art psychotherapy. This approach focuses more on the psychotherapist and their analysis of their clients' artwork verbally. The last way art therapy is looked at is through the lens of art as therapy. Some art therapists practicing art as therapy believe that analyzing the client's artwork verbally is not essential, therefore they stress the creation process of the art instead. In all of these different approaches to art therapy, the art therapist's client goes on the journey to delve into their inner thoughts and emotions by the use of paint, paper and pen, clay, sand, fabric, or other media.

Art therapy can be used to help people improve cognitive and sensory motor function, self-esteem, self awareness, and emotional resilience. It may also aide in resolving conflicts and reduce distress.

Current art therapy includes a vast number of other approaches such as person-centered, cognitive, behavior, Gestalt, narrative, Adlerian, and family. The tenets of art therapy involve humanism, creativity, reconciling emotional conflicts, fostering self-awareness, and personal growth.

History 
In the history of mental health treatment, art therapy (combining studies of psychology and art) emerged much later as a new field. This type of unconventional therapy is used to cultivate self-esteem and awareness, improve cognitive and motor abilities, resolve conflicts or stress, and inspire resilience in patients. It invites sensory, kinesthetic, perceptual, and sensory symbolization to address issues that verbal psychotherapy cannot reach. Although art therapy is a relatively young therapeutic discipline, its roots lie in the use of the arts in the 'moral treatment' of psychiatric patients in the late 18th century.

Art therapy as a profession began in the mid-20th century, arising independently in English-speaking and European countries. Art had been used at the time for various reasons: communication, inducing creativity in children, and in religious contexts. The early art therapists who published accounts of their work acknowledged the influence of aesthetics, psychiatry, psychoanalysis, rehabilitation, early childhood education, and art education, to varying degrees, on their practices.

The British artist Adrian Hill coined the term art therapy in 1942.  Hill, recovering from tuberculosis in a sanatorium, discovered the therapeutic benefits of drawing and painting while convalescing.  He wrote that the value of art therapy lay in "completely engrossing the mind (as well as the fingers)…releasing the creative energy of the frequently inhibited patient", which enabled the patient to "build up a strong defence against his misfortunes".  He suggested artistic work to his fellow patients.  That began his art therapy work, which was documented in 1945 in his book, Art Versus Illness.

The artist Edward Adamson, demobilised after WW2, joined Adrian Hill to extend Hill's work to the British long stay mental hospitals.  Other early proponents of art therapy in Britain include E. M. Lyddiatt, Michael Edwards, Diana Raphael-Halliday and Rita Simons. The British Association of Art Therapists was founded in 1964.

U.S. art therapy pioneers Margaret Naumburg and Edith Kramer began practicing at around the same time as Hill. Naumburg, an educator, asserted that "art therapy is psychoanalytically oriented" and that free art expression "becomes a form of symbolic speech which ... leads to an increase in verbalization in the course of therapy." Edith Kramer, an artist, pointed out the importance of the creative process, psychological defenses, and artistic quality, writing that "sublimation is attained when forms are created that successfully contain ... anger, anxiety, or pain."  Other early proponents of art therapy in the United States include Elinor Ulman, Robert "Bob" Ault, and Judith Rubin.  The American Art Therapy Association was founded in 1969.

National professional associations of art therapy exist in many countries, including Brazil, Canada, Finland, Lebanon, Israel, Japan, the Netherlands, Romania, South Korea, and Sweden.  International networking contributes to the establishment of standards for education and practice.

Diverse perspectives exist on history of art therapy, which complement those that focus on the institutionalization of art therapy as a profession in Britain and the United States.

Definitions 

There are various definitions of the term art therapy.

The British Association of Art Therapists defines art therapy as: "a form of psychotherapy that uses art media as its primary mode of expression and communication." They also add that "clients who are referred to an art therapist need not have previous experience in art, the art therapist is not primarily concerned with making an aesthetic or diagnostic assessment of the client's image."

The American Art Therapy Association defines art therapy as: "an integrative mental health and human services profession that enriches the lives of individuals, families, and communities through active art-making, creative p rocess, applied psychological theory, and human experience within a psychotherapeutic relationship."

Uses 
As a regulated mental health profession, art therapy is employed in many clinical and other settings with diverse populations.  It is increasingly recognized as a valid form of therapy. Art therapy can also be found in non-clinical settings, as well as in art studios and in creativity development workshops. Licensing for art therapists can vary from state to state with some recognizing art therapy as a separate license and some licensing under a related field such a professional counseling or mental health counseling.  Art therapists must have a master's degree that includes training in the creative process, psychological development, and group therapy, and they must complete a clinical internship.  Art therapists may also pursue additional credentialing through the Art Therapy Credentials Board. Art therapists work with populations of all ages and with a wide variety of disorders and diseases.  Art therapists provide services to children, adolescents, and adults, whether as individuals, couples, families, or groups.

Using their evaluative and psychotherapy skills, art therapists choose materials and interventions appropriate to their clients' needs and design sessions to achieve therapeutic goals and objectives. Other ways that therapists may choose to use art therapy with their clients include types of art like drawing self-portraits, closing their eyes while drawing, spiral drawing, and lastly drawing their emotions. They use the creative process to help their clients increase insight, cope with stress, work through traumatic experiences, increase cognitive, memory and neurosensory abilities, improve interpersonal relationships and achieve greater self-fulfillment. The activities an art therapist chooses to do with clients depend on a variety of factors such as their mental state or age. Art therapists may draw upon images from resources such as the Archive for Research in Archetypal Symbolism to incorporate historical art and symbols into their work with patients. Depending on the state, province, or country, the term "art therapist" may be reserved for those who are professionals trained in both art and therapy and hold a master or doctoral degree in art therapy or certification in art therapy obtained after a graduate degree in a related field. Other professionals, such as mental health counselors, social workers, psychologists, and play therapists, optionally combine art-making with basic psychotherapeutic modalities in their treatment. Therapists may better understand a client's absorption of information after assessing elements of their artwork.

A systemic literature review compiled and evaluated different research studies, some of which are listed below. Overall, this survey publication revealed that both the high level of variability (such as incorporating talk therapy) and limited number of studies done with certified art therapists made it difficult to generalize over findings. Despite these limitations, art therapy has, to an extent, proved its efficacy in relieving symptoms and improving quality of life.

General illness 
Art-making is a common activity used by many people to cope with illness. Art and the creative process can alleviate many illnesses (cancer, heart disease, influenza, etc.). This form of therapy helps benefit those with mental illnesses as well (chronic depression, anxiety disorders, bipolar disorders, etc.). It is difficult to measure the efficacy of art therapy as it treats various mental illnesses to different degrees; although, people can escape the emotional effects of various illness through art making and many creative methods.
Sometimes people cannot express the way they feel, as it can be difficult to put into words, and art can help people express their experiences. "During art therapy, people can explore past, present and future experiences using art as a form of coping". Art can be a refuge for the intense emotions associated with illness; there are no limits to the imagination in finding creative ways to express emotions.

Hospitals have started studying the influence of arts on patient care and found that participants in art programs have better vitals and less difficulty sleeping. Artistic influence does not need to be participation in a program, but studies have found that a landscape picture in a hospital room had reduced need for narcotic pain killers and less time in recovery at the hospital. In addition, either looking at or creating art in hospitals helped stabilize vital signs, speed up the healing process, and in general, bring a sense of hope and soul to the patient. Family, care workers, doctors and nurses are also positively affected.

Using art therapy, it can also be a good way for those with general illnesses to express their feelings and emotions through art, when it may or may not be difficult to explain their feelings through words. Art helps give security to emotions to those if they are not comfortable sharing their emotions to others, but can trust a canvas or sheet of paper to hold onto those emotions.

Subjective cancer symptoms 
Many studies have been conducted on the benefits of art therapy on cancer patients.  Art therapy has been found useful for supporting patients during the stress of such things as chemotherapy treatment.

Art therapists have conducted studies to understand why some cancer patients turn to art making as a coping mechanism and a tool to creating a positive identity outside of being a cancer patient. Women in the study participated in different art programs ranging from pottery and card making to drawing and painting. The programs helped them regain an identity outside of having cancer, lessened emotional pain from their ongoing fight with cancer, and also gave them hope for the future.

In a study involving women facing cancer-related difficulties such as fear, pain, altered social relationships, it was found that: Another study showed those who participated in these types of activities were discharged earlier than those who did not participate.

Furthermore, another study revealed the healing effects of art therapy on female breast cancer patients. Studies revealed that relatively short-term art therapy interventions significantly improved patients' emotional states and perceived symptoms.

Studies have also shown how the emotional distress of cancer patients has been reduced when utilizing the creative process. The women made drawings of themselves throughout the treatment process while also doing yoga and meditating; these actions combined helped to alleviate some symptoms.

Another study, with 111 participants, looked at the efficacy of mindfulness-based art therapy, combining meditation with art. The study used measurements such as quality of life, physical symptoms, depression, and anxiety to evaluate the efficacy of the intervention. This yielded positive results that there was a significant decrease in distress and significant improvement in quality of life.

A review of 12 studies investigating the use of art therapy in cancer patients by Wood, Molassiotis, and Payne (2010) investigated the symptoms of emotional, social, physical, and global functioning, and spiritual concerns of cancer patients. They found that art therapy can improve the process of psychological readjustment to the change, loss, and uncertainty associated with surviving cancer. It was also suggested that art therapy can provide a sense of "meaning-making" through the physical act of creating the art. When given five individual sessions of art therapy once per week, art therapy was shown to be useful for personal empowerment by helping the cancer patients understand their own boundaries in relation to the needs of other people. In turn, those who had art therapy treatment felt more connected to others and found social interaction more enjoyable than individuals who did not receive art therapy treatment. Furthermore, art therapy improved motivation levels, ability to discuss emotional and physical health, general well-being, and increased global quality of life in cancer patients.

In sum, relatively short-term intervention of art therapy that is individualized to patients has the potential to significantly improve emotional state and quality of life, while reducing perceived symptoms relating to the cancer diagnosis.

Disaster relief 
Art therapy has been used in a variety of traumatic experiences, including disaster relief and crisis intervention. Art therapists have worked with children, adolescents and adults after natural and manmade disasters, https://us.jkp.com/products/art-therapy-in-response-to-natural-disasters-mass-violence-and-crises them to make art in response to their experiences. Some suggested strategies for working with victims of disaster include: assessing for distress or post-traumatic stress disorder (PTSD), normalizing feelings, modeling coping skills, promoting relaxation skills, establishing a social support network, and increasing a sense of security and stability.

Dementia 
Although art therapy seems to help patients with dementia, a recent systematic review did not find consistent support. It is important that the art tools are easy to use and relatively simple to understand, since mobility can also be a problem.  Although art therapy helps with behavioral issues, it does not appear to affect worsening mental abilities. Tentative evidence supports benefits with respect to quality of life. Art therapy had no clear results on affecting memory or emotional well-being scales. However, Alzheimer's Association states that art and music can enrich people's lives and allow for self expression. D.W Zaidel, a researcher and therapist at VAGA, claims that engagement with art can stimulate specific areas of the brain involved in language processing and visuo-spatial perception, two cognitive functions which decline significant in dementia patients.

Autism
Art therapy is increasingly recognized to help address challenges of people with autism. Art therapy may address core symptoms of autism spectrum disorders by promoting sensory regulation, supporting psychomotor development and facilitating communication. Art therapy is also thought to promote emotional and mental growth by allowing self expression, visual communication, and creativity. Most importantly, studies have found that painting, drawing or music therapies may allow people with autism to communicate in a manner more comfortable for them than speech.

Schizophrenia
A 2005 systematic review of art therapy as an add on treatment for schizophrenia found unclear effects.  Group art therapy has been shown to improve some symptoms of schizophrenia. While studies concluded that art therapy did not improve Clinical Global Impression or Global Assessment of Functioning, they showed that the use of haptic art materials to express one's emotions, cognitions, and perceptions in a group setting lowered depressing themes and may improve self-esteem, enforce creativity, and facilitate the integrative therapeutic process for people with schizophrenia. Studies reveal that cognitive behavioral therapy has proven to be most effective for this disorder.

Geriatric patients 
Studies conducted by Regev reveal that geriatric art therapy has been significantly useful in helping depression for the elderly, although not particularly successful among dementia patients. Group therapy versus individual sessions proved to be more effective.

Trauma and children 
Art therapy may alleviate trauma-induced emotions, such as shame and anger. It is also likely to increase trauma survivors' sense of empowerment  and control by encouraging children to make choices in their artwork. Art therapy in addition to psychotherapy offered more reduction in trauma symptoms than just psychotherapy alone.

Because traumatic memories are encoded visually, creating art may be the most effective way to access them. Through art therapy, children may be able to make more sense of their traumatic experiences and form accurate trauma narratives. Gradual exposure to these narratives may reduce trauma-induced symptoms, such as flashbacks and nightmares. Repetition of directives reduces anxiety, and visually creating narratives helps clients build coping skills and balanced nervous system responses. This only works in long-term art therapy interventions.

Children who have experienced trauma may benefit from group art therapy. The group format is effective in helping survivors develop relationships with others who have experienced similar situations. Group art therapy may also be beneficial in helping children with trauma regain trust and social self-esteem. Usually, participants who undergo art therapy through group interventions have positive experiences and give their internal feelings validation.

Veterans and post-traumatic stress disorder

Art therapy has an established history of being used to treat veterans, with the American Art Therapy Association documenting its use as early as 1945.  As with other sources of trauma, combat veterans may benefit from art therapy to access memories and to engage with treatment.  A 2016 randomized control trial found that art therapy in conjunction with cognitive processing therapy (CPT) was more beneficial than CPT alone. Walter Reed Army Medical Center, the National Intrepid Center of Excellence and other Veteran Association institutions use art therapy to help veterans with PTSD.

Bereavement 
A number of therapists use art therapy to assist those who have recently experienced the death of a loved one. This is proposed to be particularly beneficial where clients find it difficult to verbalize their feelings of loss and shock, and so may use creative means to express their feelings. For example, it has been used to enable children to express their feelings of loss where they may lack the maturity to verbalize their bereavement.

Eating disorders 

Art therapy may help people with anorexia with weight improvements and may help with depression level. Traumatic or negative childhood experiences can result in unintentionally harmful coping mechanisms, such as eating disorders. As a result, clients may be cut off from their emotions, self-rejecting, and detached from their strengths. Art therapy may provide an outlet for exploring these inaccessible strengths and emotions; this is important because persons with eating disorders may not know how to vocalize their emotions.

Art therapy may be beneficial for clients with eating disorders because clients can create visual representations with art material of progress made, represent alterations to the body, and provide a nonthreatening method of acting out impulses. Individuals with eating disorders tend to rely heavily on defense mechanisms to feel a sense of control; it is important that clients feel a sense of authority over their art products through freedom of expression and controllable art materials. Through controllable media, such as pencils, markers, and colored pencils, along with freedom of choice with the media, clients with eating disorders can create boundaries around unsettling themes.

Another systematic literature review found conclusive evidence that art therapy resulted in significant weight loss in patients with obesity, as well as  helping with a range of psychological symptoms.

Ongoing daily challenges 
Those who do not have a mental illness or physical disease were also tested; these patients have ongoing daily challenges such as high-intensity jobs, financial constraints, and other personal issues. Findings revealed that art therapy reduces levels of stress and burnout related to patients' professions.

Containment
The term containment, within art therapy and other therapeutic settings, has been used to describe what the client can experience within the safety and privacy of a trusting relationship between client and counselor. This term has also been equated, within art therapy research, with the holding or confining of an issue within the boundaries of visual expression, like a border or the circumference of a mandala. The creation of mandalas for symptom regulation is not a new approach within the field of art therapy, and numerous studies have been conducted in order to assess their efficacy.

Purpose 

The purpose of art therapy is essentially one of healing.  This type of healing is used to cope with the symptoms that can happen after being diagnosed with cancer, or mental or physical disorder to reduce the suffering of the person. Art therapy does not only help with coping with trauma but helps to find other important information about people. Art therapy can be successfully applied to clients with physical, mental or emotional problems, diseases and disorders.  Any type of visual art and art medium can be employed within the therapeutic process, including painting, drawing, sculpting, photography, and digital art. Art therapy may include creative exercises such as drawing or painting a certain emotion, creative journaling, or freestyle creation.

One proposed learning mechanism is through the increased excitation, and as a consequence, strengthening of neuronal connections.

A typical session 

Art therapy can take place in a variety of different settings.  Art therapists may vary the goals of art therapy and the way they provide art therapy, depending upon the institution's or client's needs. After an assessment of the client's strengths and needs, art therapy may be offered in either an individual or group format, according to which is better suited to the person.  Art therapist Dr. Ellen G. Horovitz wrote, "My responsibilities vary from job to job. It is wholly different when one works as a consultant or in an agency as opposed to private practice. In private practice, it becomes more complex and far reaching. If you are the primary therapist then your responsibilities can swing from the spectrum of social work to the primary care of the patient. This includes dovetailing with physicians, judges, family members, and sometimes even community members that might be important in the caretaking of the individual."  

Like other psychotherapists in private practice, some art therapists find it important to ensure, for the therapeutic relationship, that the sessions occur each week in the same space and at the same time.

Art therapy is often offered in schools as a form of therapy for children because of their creativity and interest in art as a means of expression. Art therapy can benefit children with a variety of issues, such as learning disabilities, speech and language disorders, behavioral disorders, and other emotional disturbances that might be hindering a child's learning. Similar to other psychologists that work in schools, art therapists should be able to diagnose the problems facing their student clients, and individualize treatment and interventions.  Art therapists work closely with teachers and parents in order to implement their therapy strategies.

Art-based assessments 
Art therapists and other professionals use art-based assessments to evaluate emotional, cognitive, and developmental conditions. There are also many psychological assessments that utilize artmaking to analyze various types of mental functioning (Betts, 2005). Art therapists and other professionals are educated to administer and interpret these assessments, most of which rely on simple directives and a standardized array of art materials (Malchiodi 1998, 2003; Betts, 2005). The first drawing assessment for psychological purposes was created in 1906 by German psychiatrist Fritz Mohr (Malchiodi 1998). In 1926, researcher Florence Goodenough created a drawing test to measure the intelligence in children called the Draw-A-Man Test (Malchiodi 1998). The key to interpreting the Draw-A-Man Test was that the more details a child incorporated into the drawing, the more intelligent they were (Malchiodi, 1998). Goodenough and other researchers realized the test had just as much to do with personality as it did intelligence (Malchiodi, 1998). Several other psychiatric art assessments were created in the 1940s, and have been used ever since (Malchiodi 1998).

Notwithstanding, many art therapists eschew diagnostic testing and indeed some writers (Hogan 1997) question the validity of therapists making interpretative assumptions. More recent literature, however, highlights the utility of standardized approaches to treatment planning and clinical decision-making, such as is evidenced through this source.
Below are some examples of art therapy assessments:

Mandala Assessment Research Instrument 
In this assessment, a person is asked to select a card from a deck with different mandalas (designs enclosed in a geometric shape) and then must choose a color from a set of colored cards. The person is then asked to draw the mandala from the card they choose with an oil pastel of the color of their choice. The artist is then asked to explain if there were any meanings, experiences, or related information related to the mandala they drew. This test is based on the beliefs of Joan Kellogg, who sees a recurring correlation between the images, pattern and shapes in the mandalas that people draw and the personalities of the artists. This test assesses and gives clues to a person's psychological progressions and their current psychological condition (Malchiodi 1998).
The mandala originates in Buddhism; its connections with spirituality help us to see links with transpersonal art.

House–Tree–Person 

In the house-tree-person test, the client is asked to make a drawing that includes a house, a tree and a person, after which the therapist asks several questions about each. For example, with reference to the house, Buck (1984) wrote questions such as, "Is it a happy house?" and "What is the house made of?" Regarding the tree, questions include, "About how old is that tree?" and "Is the tree alive?" Concerning the person, questions include, "Is that person happy?" and "How does that person feel?"

The house-tree-person test is a projective personality test, a type of exam in which the test taker responds to or provides ambiguous, abstract, or unstructured stimuli (often in the form of pictures or drawings). It is to measure aspects of a person's personality through interpretation of drawings and responses to questions, self-perceptions and attitudes.

Outsider art 

The relation between the fields of art therapy and outsider art has been widely debated. The term art brut was first coined by French artist Jean Dubuffet to describe "art created outside the boundaries of official culture". Dubuffet used the term art brut to focus on artistic practice by insane-asylum patients. The English translation "outsider art" was first used by art critic Roger Cardinal in 1972.

Both terms have been criticized because of their social and personal impact on both patients and artists.
Art therapy professionals have been accused of not putting enough emphasis on the artistic value and meaning of the artist's works, considering them only from a medical perspective. This led to the misconception of the whole outsider art practice, while addressing therapeutical issues within the field of aesthetical discussion.
Outsider art, on the contrary, has been negatively judged because of the labeling of the artists' work, i.e. the equation artist = genius = insane. Moreover, the business-related issues on the term outsider art carry some misunderstandings.  While the outsider artist is part of a specific art system, which can add a positive value to both the artist's work as well as his personal development, it can also imprison him within the boundaries of the system itself.

See also 

 Artistic freedom
 Bibliotherapy
 Comic book therapy
 Expressive therapy
 List of psychotherapies
 List of therapies

References

External links

Edward Adamson
Creative arts therapies